Delhi Accord was a tripartite agreement (verbal) in Delhi after mutual agreement between Ranas, Nepali congress party and King Tribhuban.

Background
The Rana Regime of Nepal started in 1846 when Jung Bahadur Rana assumed full power after the Kot Massacre. This reduced the status of the King to a mere figurehead and vested all powers in the hands of the hereditary Prime Ministers of the Rana family. This regime was highly authoritarian, isolationist and oppressive. The Rana Prime Ministers restricted education to just the members of the Rana family and some other aristocrats, executed and imprisoned any objectors and held the Royal Family captive. In time, anti-Rana sentiments grew strong among aristocrats who worked with Nepalis living in India to fuel a revolution against the oppressive regime.
King Tribhuvan's anti-Rana attitude had been an open secret for a long time in Nepal. In November 10th 1950, he took refuge at the Indian Embassy against the restrictions imposed on him by the Ranas. He was accompanied by his son Mahendra and eldest grandson Birendra, among a number of other royal family members excluding Gyanendra, the infant son of Crown Prince Mahendra. On 10th November, two Indian planes landed at Gauchar Airport and flew back to New Delhi with the Royal family. King Tribhuvan was formally welcomed by the Indian prime minister Jawahar Lal Nehru and other high officials.

Provisions
The major provisions of the Delhi Accord (Agreement) are as follows:
An elected constituent assembly will frame a democratic constitution within 2 years.
There will remain an interim cabinet (government) of 10 ministers under the Prime Ministership of Mohan Shumsher of which 5 will be taken from the Nepali congress.
There will be no restriction to open political organizations. All the political prisoners will be set free and agitators have to hand over all the weapons to the government and stop the movement.
King Tribhuvan will remain the King of Nepal and ultimate power lies in the monarch.
The cabinet formed under the premiership of Mohan Sumsher will remain till the day of election of house of representatives i.e. Mohan Sumsher will be the Prime minister of Nepal till the day of next election.

Aftermath
On 15 February 1951, King Tribhuvan and the leading members of the Nepali Congress returned to Kathmandu. Huge flock of supporters gathered and welcome their monarch at the airport. On 18 February 1951, King Tribhuvan announced Nepal's first steps to democracy with a historical proclamation. According to the Delhi accord coalition government was formed. The members of the cabinet were:
1. Sir Mohan Shamsher - Prime minister and Foreign Affairs.
2. Sir Baber Shamsher Jang Bahadur Rana - Defence.
3. Chudraj Shamsher - Forests.
4. Nripa Janga Rana - Education.
5. Yagya Bahadur Basnyat - (Rana  Bhardar) - Health and Local self-government.

From the Nepali Congress side:

1. Subarna Shamsher Rana - Finance.
2. B.P. Koirala - Home.
3. Ganesh Man Singh - Commerce and Industry
4. Bharatmani Sharma - Food and Agriculture
5. Bhadrakali Mishra - Transport.
This cabinet was reshuffled on 10 June 1951 to replace Baber Shamsher by Shangha Shamsher and Bharatmani Sharma by Surya Prasad Upadhyaya

Legacy
Finally, On 7th Falgun 2007 B.S. King Tribhuban returned to Nepal as a head of state, thus ended the rana rule. This agreement was one of the major stepping stone for the power shift of government from the autocratic families

References
4. Autobiography: B. P. Koirala

History of Nepal (1951–2008)
Rana regime
1951 establishments in Nepal